George Hamilton Smith (February 10, 1949 – April 8, 2022) was an American author, editor, educator, and speaker, known for his writings on atheism and libertarianism.

Biography 
Smith grew up mostly in Tucson, Arizona, and attended the University of Arizona for several years before leaving without a degree; he relocated to Los Angeles during 1971. With the help of libertarian editor Roy A. Childs, Jr., he secured a contract from Nash Publishing (then located in Los Angeles) to produce a book on atheism. The finished product was his first book, Atheism: The Case Against God (1974).

Smith began teaching in the 1970s, first under the auspices of his own Forum for Philosophical Studies (with offices on Sunset Boulevard in Los Angeles), later under the auspices of the Cato Institute and the Institute for Humane Studies (IHS). For nearly twenty years, from the mid-1970s to the mid-1990s, he spent his summers teaching political philosophy and American political and intellectual history to university students at seminars sponsored by Cato Institute and IHS.

During the 1980s, Smith worked for more than six years as the general editor of Knowledge Products, a Nashville-based company that produced educational audio recordings in philosophy, history, economics, and current affairs. During those years, in addition to his duties as editor, Smith was also the primary scriptwriter for Knowledge Products' Great Political Thinkers series. These recordings have been used widely in college classrooms.

Since 1971, more than one hundred of Smith's articles and book reviews have appeared in a wide range of publications, including The New York Times, the Arizona Daily Star, Reason Magazine, Free Inquiry, The Humanist, Inquiry, Cato Policy Report, Liberty, The Voluntaryist, Academic Associates Book News, Journal of Libertarian Studies, and Humane Studies Review. He wrote a weekly column on libertarian and classical liberal thought for Libertarianism.org, a website operated by Cato.

He presented his arguments in favor of non-political participation in his "party" dialogue neither bullets nor ballots, considering it a practice of power, through rhetoric; even though its activity is carried out by parties in favor of freedom and justice, since every party exercises the coercive power of the State, whether it uses it or not, and always under political commitments. Mistrusting all political activity, he separated libertarianism from partisanship.

His published works often dealt with such issues as capital punishment (which he opposed), anarchism, libertarianism, religious toleration, and atheism. He wrote about William Wollaston, Herbert Spencer, Thomas Hobbes, John Locke, Ayn Rand, and other figures. On December 31, 2007, George Smith provided a humorous "qualified endorsement" of Republican Party candidate Ron Paul via YouTube for libertarian voters, but also one that was consistent with his published writings on electoral politics.

In 2013, Cambridge University Press published his book The System of Liberty: Themes in the History of Classical Liberalism.

He died on April 8, 2022, in Bloomington, Illinois, United States.

Selected publications 
 Atheism: The Case Against God. Los Angeles: Nash, 1974. 
The Literature of Freethought, Libertarian Review, Vol. VI, No. 1 (January–February 1977).
 "William Wollaston on Property Rights", Journal of Libertarian Studies, Vol. 2, no. 3, 1978, pp. 217–25.
 "Justice Entrepreneurship in a Free Market", Journal of Libertarian Studies, Vol. 3, no. 4  (Winter 1979): pp. 405–26.
 "Justice Entrepreneurship Revisited", Journal of Libertarian Studies, Vol. 3, no. 4  (Winter 1979): pp. 453–69.
 "Herbert Spencer's Theory of Causation", Journal of Libertarian Studies, Vol. 5 (Spring 1981), no. 2: pp. 113–52.
 Atheism, Ayn Rand and Other Heresies. 1991. .
 "A Killer's Right to Life", Liberty, Vol. 10, no. 2 (November 1996): 46.
 "Inalienable Rights?", Liberty, Vol. 10, no. 6 (July 1997): 51.
 Why Atheism? Amherst, N.Y.: Prometheus Books, 2000. .
 
 The System of Liberty: Themes in the History of Classical Liberalism New York: Cambridge University Press, 2013.

See also 
American philosophy
Implicit and explicit atheism
List of American philosophers
Right-libertarianism
Voluntaryism

References

External links

 David Gordon's review of Atheism: Ayn Rand and Other Heresies in The Journal of Libertarian Studies, Vol. 10, no. 2 (Fall 1992)
 N. Stephan Kinsella's response to Smith regarding capital punishment
 Comment on Smith Steven Strasnick. ''"Justice Entrepreneurship in A Free Market":
 Anthony Flood, Atheism Analyzed: The Implosion of George Smith's "Case against God." Kindle ebook, 2019.
 Michael Martin's review of "Atheism: The Case Against God"
 David Boaz on the work of George H. Smith

1949 births
American atheists
American libertarians
American philosophers
Atheist philosophers
Freethought writers
Libertarian theorists
Living people
Rationalists
University of Arizona alumni
Voluntaryists
Writers about religion and science